Alpena  is a town in Boone and Carroll counties in the U.S. state of Arkansas.  The population was 374 at the 2020 census.

The Boone County portion of Alpena is part of the Harrison Micropolitan Statistical Area.

History

Alpena Pass was founded in 1908 on top of a graveyard shortly after the Missouri and North Arkansas Railroad was built through Boone County.  In the 1950s, the word "pass" was dropped from the name, thus creating the current name, Alpena.

At the time of the town's founding, the town of Carrollton was in decline.  Many of the buildings of Carrollton were disassembled, moved and reassembled at Alpena Pass.  MADtv's Rice and Beans Tour once came through the town, doing a tongue-in-cheek exposé about rural America. They encountered a seemingly drug-intoxicated woman and had an interview with the "mayor".

Geography

According to the United States Census Bureau, the town has a total area of 3.5 km2 (1.4 mi2), all land.

Major highways

 U.S. Highway 62
 US 412

Demographics

As of the census of 2000, there were 371 people, 146 households, and 95 families residing in the town.  The population density was 105.3/km2 (272.9/mi2).  There were 170 housing units at an average density of 48.3/km2 (125.1/mi2).  The racial makeup of the town was 96.50% White, 2.16% Native American, 0.27% Asian, and 1.08% from two or more races.  2.43% of the population were Hispanic or Latino of any race.

There were 146 households, out of which 35.6% had children under the age of 18 living with them, 45.9% were married couples living together, 12.3% had a female householder with no husband present, and 34.9% were non-families. 31.5% of all households were made up of individuals, and 19.9% had someone living alone who was 65 years of age or older.  The average household size was 2.54 and the average family size was 3.21.

In the town, the population was spread out, with 31.0% under the age of 18, 7.3% from 18 to 24, 26.1% from 25 to 44, 18.3% from 45 to 64, and 17.3% who were 65 years of age or older.  The median age was 31 years. For every 100 females, there were 83.7 males.  For every 100 females age 18 and over, there were 89.6 males.

The median income for a household in the town was $23,906, and the median income for a family was $28,333. Males had a median income of $29,000 versus $17,125 for females. The per capita income for the town was $13,429.  About 7.3% of families and 13.3% of the population were below the poverty line, including 5.0% of those under age 18 and 29.4% of those age 65 or over.

Education
The Boone County portion of Alpena, along with part of the Carroll County portion Alpena is within the Alpena School District, which leads to graduation from Alpena High School  A small part of the Carroll County portion of Alpena is within the Green Forest School District.

Climate

The climate in this area is characterized by hot, humid summers and generally mild to cool winters.  According to the Köppen Climate Classification system, Alpena has a humid subtropical climate, abbreviated "Cfa" on climate maps.

Notable people
 Brandon Burlsworth, All-American football player for the Arkansas Razorbacks.
 Ron McNair, Republican member of the Arkansas House of Representatives.
 B. Jim Porter, served as Louisiana Secretary of the Department of Natural Resources.

References

External links
 Map of Alpena (US Census Bureau)
 Boone County Historical and Railroad Society, Inc.
 Alpena School District
 Town government information
 Detailed 2000 Census Statistics
 Boone County School District Reference Map (US Census Bureau, 2010)
 Carroll County School District Reference Map (US Census Bureau, 2010)

 

Towns in Boone County, Arkansas
Towns in Carroll County, Arkansas
Towns in Arkansas
Harrison, Arkansas micropolitan area
Populated places established in 1908
1908 establishments in Arkansas